Georgia Military College (GMC) is a public military junior college in Milledgeville, Georgia. It is divided into the junior college, a military junior college program, high school, middle school, and elementary school. It was originally known as Middle Georgia Military and Agricultural College, until 1900. Although it is a state-funded institution, GMC is not affiliated with either the University System of Georgia or the Technical College System of Georgia.

GMC's main facility is housed in the restored old Georgia state capitol building  that was the seat of government for the State of Georgia from 1807–68. The main campus in Milledgeville serves approximately 254 full-time, resident ROTC Cadets and 1300 commuter students. GMC's 13 campuses, and a Global Online College with nearly 16,500 students.

GMC is one of four military junior colleges that participate in the U.S. Army's Early Commissioning Program.  Students who graduate from GMC's two-year, military science-oriented curriculum receive an officer's commission in the U.S. Army. The junior college was established in 1879, and later added a preparatory school for students in sixth grade through twelfth grade.

GMC's military preparatory school for Cadets is in Baldwin County and has approximately 279 middle school students and 277 high-school Junior ROTC (JROTC) students. The preparatory school's dual enrollment program enables qualified sophomores, juniors, and seniors to attend classes at the junior college and the high school simultaneously, while earning credit for both their high school diploma and their college degree.

Campuses 

In addition to the main campus in Milledgeville, GMC Junior College other campus locations (Fairburn), Augusta, Columbus, Madison, Sandersville, Valdosta, Warner Robins, Fayetteville, Dublin, Eastman, Stone Mountain and a Global Online College. The other campus locations serve as junior colleges to their local communities.

Georgia Military College Columbus Campus is the only liberal arts junior college in Columbus. The Columbus campus opened at Fort Benning in 1997, moved to Cross Country Office Park in 2004, and into a newly built facility at 7300 Blackmon Road in January 2013.

GMC also operates a Global Online Campus. This allows GMC to offer degrees to people who that work and don't have the time to come to campus, who are stationed overseas, or just enjoy going to school online. The online campus allows GMC to serve not just local but also global communities.

Corps of Cadets 
The GMC Corps of Cadets is designed to enhance leadership capabilities of students in both military and civilian lives. Cadets do daily physical training to improve fitness. Some cadets are selected to partake in the ranger challenge competition. During the day, cadets attend classes throughout the day to work on academics. Along with this, cadets also frequently stand in for parades and command retreat. There are also multiple clubs and extracurriculars cadets can take part in such as drill and color guard teams, a glee club, and more. Cadets also may be selected to hold leadership in the corps where they will be assigned at the team to regimental levels or staff duty. When cadets first arrive at GMC, they go through a six-week "plebe" phase to introduce them to military customs and life at the junior college.

GMC opened its modern barracks (dorm) facility in January 2007 for the 254 students that comprise the Corps of Cadets. A new academic building and dining hall have recently been completed.

Cadet Types 
The Corps of Cadets have several types of cadets in the program. These include Early Commissioning Program cadets, State Service cadets, Civic Leaders, and Service Academy Prep cadets.

Early Commissioning Program 

GMC's Early Commissioning Program (ECP) is designed to enable students to become a second lieutenant in the US Army after the first two years in college. GMC offers funding specifically to help pay costs for Corps of Cadet members on the Milledgeville campus. The State Service Scholarship Program provides 39 full scholarships to qualified Georgia residents with an interest in military service as well as a quality college education. The program is funded through the Georgia General Assembly. Scholarship recipients are required to become members of either the Army or Air National Guard, and must be nominated by a member of the Georgia General Assembly. These scholarships cover tuition, fees, rooms, board, books and supplies. Scholarship winners must join the Corps of Cadets and participate in Army ROTC. Army ROTC scholarships are also available for qualified cadets interested in the Early Commissioning Program (ECP). These scholarships are funded through ROTC and cover tuition, fees, and books, plus a monthly stipend. There are various options for ROTC scholarship based on the student's desire for active duty or reserve component duty.

After completing studies at GMC, a transfer scholarship is available for those GMC graduates desiring to complete their four-year degree at a university of their choosing with an ROTC program. Being commissioned, they do not take military science classes, however, are still expected to get their bachelor's degree or have their commission revoked.

One of the ways in which a student can become an ECP cadet is to attend Basic Camp (not to be confused with Basic Combat Training, which is for enlisted soldiers). The course is thirty-one days long. Between the cadet's freshmen and sophomore years, the cadet will attend the Advanced Camp at Fort Knox, Kentucky. Following AC, the cadet may be able to attend additional training with Army units all over the world and in the United States. After completing required training, the Cadet is commissioned as a U.S. Army officer at the end of his/her sophomore year. The ECP program allows cadets to become commissioned second lieutenants two years earlier than normal ROTC and West Point cadets. These commissioned army officers can then serve in the Army Reserve or Army National Guard, or compete for revocation and then for active duty. After completing their four-year degrees, they will be promoted as a first lieutenant.

State Service cadets 
State Service cadets are cadets who attend GMC while simultaneously serving in the Georgia National Guard. These cadets still retain their same rank in the National Guard and attend drill regularly with heir unit. Unlike ECP cadets, State Service cadets do not commission upon graduation and maintain their same service obligation.

Civic Leaders 
Civic Leader cadets hold no military obligation and upon graduation may choose to further their education at a 4-year university or seek employment. These cadets still are able to get the benefits of increased discipline and leadership skills.

Service Academy Prep cadets 
Students who apply to a service academy may be redirected to attend GMC for a year. During this year, they are expected to take a strong course load, take on extracurriculars, and excel physically in hopes of receiving appointment to the service academy of their choice. These cadets are divided between cadets who have been nominated from their service academy and receive a scholarship from their branch's academy and self-prep cadets who have not been nominated and pay through other means (financial aid, cash, loans, other scholarships).

High school and middle school
Because it is part of JROTC, GMC's high school has mandatory 50-minute LET (Leadership, Education, Training) classes throughout the day. The school day is followed by a 50-minute period of marching on Davenport field three times a week.

After-school extracurricular activities include marching band, football, baseball, basketball, softball, rifle team, drill team, dance line, cheerleading, color guard, cross country, soccer, tennis, track, and raiders.
 
The school's middle school is modeled after the high school, having drill at the end of the day led by cadets.

History 

Georgia Military College was created in 1879 by act of the Georgia General Assembly "to educate young men and women from the Middle Georgia area in an environment which fosters the qualities of good citizenship." It was the apparent intention of the General Assembly to establish the school as a unit of the slowly forming University System of Georgia. State property in Milledgeville, including the former state capital building which had been damaged by General William T. Sherman's "March to the Sea", was loaned to the University of Georgia by the Act of 1879, and the Board of Trustees of the University of Georgia was given veto powers by this Act over the acts of the local Board of Trustees of the new institution. The school was originally called Middle Georgia Military and Agricultural College and was ceded state government lands surrounding the Old Capitol Building, the seat of government for the state of Georgia from 1807–1868. The Old Capitol Building, then as now, is the main college facility and sits on the highest point in Milledgeville. Former Confederate general Daniel Harvey Hill served as president from 1885 until August 1889, when he resigned due to failing health. (He died in Charlotte, NC on September 24, 1889.) The 1890 graduating class was the first to include female students.

The college's intended purpose was to enable graduates to enter higher classes at the University of Georgia, to give training in agriculture and mining, and, finally, to train teachers.

The name of the school was changed to Georgia Military College in 1900. Legislative acts of 1920 and 1922 severed the relationship with the University of Georgia and gave the local board total power over the operations of the school. In 1922 the method of electing members of the Board of Trustees and filling vacancies on the board was changed. This act provided for a seven-member board to be elected from and by the citizens of Milledgeville, with trustees' terms staggered to provide continuity. In 1930 the official addition of a junior college division to the college-preparatory secondary school finally justified its name. In 1950 the Defense Department designated the institution a "military junior college." Today it is one of only four remaining US military junior colleges so designated.

Athletics 

Georgia Military College competes in soccer, tennis, golf, cross country, softball, and football. The football program has firmly established itself as one of the finest junior college programs in the country. Since 1991, GMC has developed 36 All-Americans, won the Junior College National Championship in 2001, played for the national championship in 2002, played in eight junior college bowl games, and sent over 250 young men to continue their education and athletic careers at four-year institutions across the country. The football team finished the 2005 season ranked second in the nation.

On the golf course, the Bulldogs took home the 2004 NJCAA DIII National Championship Trophy, with Brendon O'Connell taking the individual title.

Alumnus Macoumba Kandji scored the game-winning goal in the 2010 MLS Cup, lifting the Colorado Rapids soccer team over FC Dallas.

Notable alumni 
 William P. Acker, USAF, former commander of Third Air Force and 19th president of Georgia Military College
 J. I. Albrecht, Hall of Fame CFL General Manager, of the Montreal Alouettes and Toronto Argonauts. 
 Alfred Blalock, cardiac surgery pioneer
 Lorenzo Bromell, former NFL player
 Trent Brown, NFL player
 Durant Brooks, former NFL player and Ray Guy Award winner
 George Busbee, governor of Georgia (1975–1983)
 Isaac Butts, professional basketball player
 Bobby Christine, United States Attorney for the Southern District of Georgia
 Nic Clemons, former NFL player
 Charles B. Eichelberger, former deputy chief of staff for intelligence, U.S. Army
Mike Giallombardo, member of the Florida House of Representatives
 Oliver Hardy, comedian from Laurel and Hardy; was a pupil for some years
 Shelby Highsmith, former Senior Judge of the United States District Court for the Southern District of Florida.
 Corvey Irvin, former NFL player
 Claude M. Kicklighter, former commanding general of U.S. Army Western Command (later known as United States Army Pacific)
 Macoumba Kandji, professional footballer
 Culver Kidd Jr., Georgia state representative and senator
 Powell A. Moore, former United States representative to the Organization for Security and Co-operation in Europe
 William Theodore Moore Jr., Senior United States district judge of the United States District Court for the Southern District of Georgia.
 Max W. Noah. former comptroller of the United States Army and commandant of the United States Army Engineering School
 DeAnna Pappas, TV personality
 Keith Stokes, former NFL and CFL player. 
 William Usery, former United States secretary of labor
 Carl Vinson, father of the Two-Ocean Navy Act
 Daniel Wilcox, former NFL player
 Robin L. Williams, former member Georgia House of Representatives
 Jarius Wynn, former NFL player
 Peppi Zellner, former NFL player

References

External links

 
 "Middle Georgia Military & Agricultural College", Union Recorder, August 21, 1900 from the Milledgeville Historic Newspapers Archive in the Digital Library of Georgia
 "Tocqueville in Milledgeville" - Segment from C-SPAN's Alexis de Tocqueville Tour, broadcast from and featuring discussion of Georgia Military College

Military education and training in the United States
Junior colleges in Georgia (U.S. state)
Public universities and colleges in Georgia (U.S. state)
Educational institutions established in 1879
Military high schools in the United States
United States military junior colleges
Universities and colleges accredited by the Southern Association of Colleges and Schools
Education in Baldwin County, Georgia
Schools in Baldwin County, Georgia
1879 establishments in Georgia (U.S. state)
NJCAA athletics